Selikhnovo is the name of several rural localities (villages) in Pskov Oblast, Russia:
Selikhnovo, Pskovsky District, Pskov Oblast, a village in Pskovsky District
Selikhnovo, Pushkinogorsky District, Pskov Oblast, a village in Pushkinogorsky District